Belmont School may refer to:

in Australia
 Belmont High School (Victoria), Australia
 Belmont City College, a state secondary school in Perth, Western Australia. 

in Canada
 Belmont Elementary School (Langley, British Columbia), a bilingual public elementary school in Langley, British Columbia, Canada
 Belmont Secondary School, located in Langford, British Columbia, Canada

in New Zealand
 Belmont Intermediate School, located in Belmont, North Shore City, Auckland, New Zealand

in the United Kingdom
 Belmont, the preparatory school of the Mill Hill School Foundation
 Belmont High School, Private School for boys aged 11-16 Rawtenstall, England
 Belmont Academy, the largest secondary school in Ayr, and the 6th largest in Scotland
 Belmont House School, Glasgow, United Kingdom
 Belmont Community School, a comprehensive school in Belmont, County Durham, England
 Belmont School (Surrey), a co-educational independent school in Holmbury St. Mary, near Dorking, Surrey

in the United States

 Belmont High School (Los Angeles, California), United States
 Belmont High School (Belmont, Massachusetts), United States
 Belmont High School (Belmont, Mississippi), United States
 Belmont Hill School, located in Belmont, a suburb of Boston, Massachusetts, United States
 Belmont High School (New Hampshire), United States
 Belmont Preparatory High School, The Bronx, New York City, New York  United States
 Belmont Middle School, a public middle school in the Gaston County Schools school district located in Belmont, North Carolina, United States
 Belmont High School (Ohio), United States
Belmont School (Philadelphia, Pennsylvania), listed on the National Register of Historic Places in west Philadelphia
 Belmont High School (Belmont, Wisconsin), United States

Other uses
 Belmont - Redwood Shores School District, a school district in California, United States that serves the Belmont and Redwood Shores areas
 Belmont Elementary School District, a school district in California, United States
 Belmont Public Schools, a school district that serves Belmont, Massachusetts, United States

See also
 Belmont (disambiguation)
 Bellmont High School, a public high school in Decatur, Indiana, United States